Poland participated in the Junior Eurovision Song Contest 2016 which took place on 20 November 2016, in Valletta, Malta. The Polish broadcaster Telewizja Polska (TVP) was responsible for organising their entry for the contest. A national final of nine competing acts participated in a televised production where the winner was determined by a 50/50 combination of votes from jury members made up of music professionals and a public telephone vote. On 15 October 2016, Olivia Wieczorek was selected to represent Poland with the song "Nie zapomnij".

Background

They have never won the contest, only finishing in last place in 2003.

Before Junior Eurovision
The Polish broadcaster announced on 13 July 2016, that they would be making their return to the contest after a twelve-year absence. TVP was responsible for organising the national selection show in order to select their entrant and song. The show was scheduled to take place on 8 October 2016, but was later changed to 15 October. On 14 October 2016, Jagoda Krystek withdrew from the Junior Eurovision selection.

Final
The national final took place on 15 October 2016, which saw ten competing acts participating in a televised production where the winner was determined by a 50/50 combination of both telephone vote and the votes of jury members made up of music professionals. Olivia Wieczorek was selected to represent Poland with the song "Nie zapomnij".

Key:
 Winner

Artist and song information

Olivia Wieczorek
Olivia Wieczorek (born 28 October 2002) is a Polish singer. She represented Poland at the Junior Eurovision Song Contest 2016 in Valletta, Malta on 20 November 2016 with the song "Nie zapomnij".

Olivia began singing at the age of five when she took part in a Christmas singing competition and won. Following this, she competed in various contests, achieving good results. Olivia realised that music and singing were her biggest passions and her family encouraged her to pursue her dreams.

Olivia's biggest breakthrough came when she won a popular talent show for children in Poland where she met Piotr Rubik, a famous Polish composer, producer and musician. He was so amazed by her unique talent that he decided to invite Olivia to perform in his concerts as a soloist. Olivia went on to perform at many concerts in Poland and around the world with a symphony orchestra and choir, often being accompanied by more than 110 musicians on stage. In 2016, she performed at World Youth Day in front of an audience of 100,000 people. Before the Junior Eurovision Song Contest, Olivia toured the US and Canada, performing at 10 concerts with Piotr Rubik.

Nie zapomnij

"Nie zapomnij" (English translation: "Don't forget") is a song by Polish singer Olivia Wieczorek. It will represent Poland during the Junior Eurovision Song Contest 2016. It is composed and written by Piotr Rubik and Dominik Grabowski.

At Junior Eurovision
During the opening ceremony and the running order draw which took place on 14 November 2016, Poland was drawn to perform eighth on 20 November 2016, following Macedonia and preceding Belarus.

Final
The final was broadcast in Poland on TVP1 and TVP Polonia with commentary by Artur Orzech.

Voting
During the press conference for the Junior Eurovision Song Contest 2016, held in Stockholm, the Reference Group announced several changes to the voting format for the 2016 contest. Previously, points had been awarded based on a combination of 50% National juries and 50% televoting, with one more set of points also given out by a 'Kids' Jury'. For the first time since the inauguration of the contest the voting procedure will not include a public televote. Following these results, three expert jurors will also announce their points from 1-8, 10, and 12. These professional jurors are: Christer Björkman, Mads Grimstad, and Jedward.

References

Junior Eurovision Song Contest
Poland
Junior